The 2018–19 Coupe de France preliminary rounds, Occitanie was the qualifying competition to decide which teams from the leagues of the Occitanie region of France took part in the main competition from the seventh round.

First round 
The first round is organised by individual districts..

These matches are from the Ariège district, and were played on 25 and 26 August 2018.

These matches are from the Aveyron district, and were played on 24, 25 and 26 August 2018.

These matches are from the Gers district, and were played on 24, 25, 26 and 29 August 2018.

These matches are from the Lot district, and were played on 17, 18 and 19 August 2018.

These matches are from the Hautes-Pyrénées district, and were played on 24, 25 and 26 August 2018.

These matches are from the Tarn district, and were played on 25 and 26 August 2018.

These matches are from the Tarn-et-Garonne district, and were played on 17, 18 and 19 August 2018.

These matches are from the Haute-Garonne district, and were played on 24, 25 and 26 August 2018.

These matches are from the Aude district, and were played on 26 August 2018.

These matches are from the Gard-Lozère district, and were played on 26 August 2018.

These matches are from the Hérault district, and were played on 25 and 26 August 2018.

These matches are from the Pyrénées-Orientales district, and were played on 25 and 26 August 2018.

Second round 
The second round is organised by individual districts.

These matches are from the Ariège district, and were played on 1 September 2018.

These matches are from the Aveyron district, and were played on 31 August and 1 and 2 September 2018.

These matches are from the Gers district, and were played on 31 August and 1 September 2018.

These matches are from the Lot district, and were played on 24, 25 and 26 August 2018.

These matches are from the Hautes-Pyrénées district, and were played on 31 August and 1 September 2018.

These matches are from the Tarn district, and were played on 1 and 2 September 2018.

These matches are from the Tarn-et-Garonne district, and were played on 25 and 26 August 2018.

These matches are from the Haute-Garonne district, and were played on 31 August and 1 and 2 September 2018.

These matches are from the Aude district, and were played on 2 September 2018.

These matches are from the Gard-Lozère district, and were played on 31 August and 1 and 2 September 2018.

These matches are from the Hérault district, and were played on 2 September 2018.

These matches are from the Pyrénées-Orientales district, and were played on 2 September 2018.

Third round 
These matches were played on 15 and 16 September 2018.

Fourth round 
These matches were played on 29 and 30 September 2018.

Fifth round 
These matches were played on 13 and 14 October 2018.

Sixth round 
These matches were played on 27 and 28 October 2018.

References 

2018–19 Coupe de France